Monastic granges were outlying landholdings held by monasteries independent of the manorial system. The first granges were owned by the Cistercians and other orders followed. Wealthy monastic houses had many granges, most of which were largely agricultural providing food for the monastic community. A grange might be established adjacent to the monastery but others were established wherever it held lands, some at a considerable distance. Some granges were worked by lay-brothers belonging to the order, others by paid labourers.

Granges could be of six known types: agrarian, sheep or cattle farms, horse studs, fisheries and industrial complexes. Industrial granges were significant in the development of medieval industries, particularly iron working.

Description
Granges were landed estates used for food production, centred on a farm and out-buildings and possibly a mill or a tithe barn.  The word grange comes through French  from Latin  meaning a granary. The granges might be located at some distance. They could farm livestock or produce crops. Specialist crops might include apples, hops or grapes to make beverages. Some granges had fish-ponds to supply Friday meals to the monastery. The produce could sustain the monks or be sold for profit. While under monastic control, granges might be run by a steward and worked by local farm labourers or perhaps lay brothers.

England
At the Dissolution of the Monasteries, all monastic land was seized by Henry VIII. The lands were sold or given to Henry's followers. Granges often retained their names and many can still be found in the British landscape today.

References

Types of farms
History of Catholic monasticism
Medieval Ireland
Medieval Wales

Christian monasteries in the United Kingdom